Deltocyathus is a genus of cnidarians belonging to the monotypic family Deltocyathidae.

The genus has cosmopolitan distribution.

Species

Species:
Deltocyathus agassizi 
Deltocyathus alatus 
Deltocyathus aldingensis

References

Scleractinia
Scleractinia genera